Football, as a sport played by the masses, started late in Puerto Rico's history. There were several amateur tournaments and leagues throughout the second half of the 20th century, but it wasn't until 2008 when the first professional football league was started. Here is an incomplete list of champions in Puerto Rico's football history.

Torneo Nacional Superior
The "Torneo Nacional Superior" (TNS) (Mayor National Tournament) was the first attempt at organizing the football clubs in the island. It lasted for fifty-six seasons.
 1945–57 - Not known
 1957–58 - Caribes FC
 1958–90 - Not known
 1990–91 - Cruz Azul (Guayama)
 1991–93 - Not known
 1993–94 - Rafael Santiago
 1994–95 - Not known

For unknown reasons, several teams broke away and created a second league. Both of them existed from 1995 till 2005, when a united national championship was organized.
 1995–96 - Académicos de Quintana (Hato Rey)
 1996–97 - Académicos de Quintana (Hato Rey)
 1997–98 - Académicos de Quintana (Hato Rey)
 1998–99 - CF Nacional (Carolina)
 1999–00 - Académicos de Quintana (Hato Rey)
 2000–01 - Académicos de Quintana (Hato Rey)
 2001–02 - Académicos de Quintana (Hato Rey)
 2002–03 - Not played
 2003–04 - Not played
 2004–05 - Not played

Asociación de Fútbol de Puerto Rico
The "Asociación de Fútbol de Puerto Rico" (Puerto Rico Football Association) existed for a single season (1996) with teams from San Juan, Yabucoa, Caguas, Maunabo, Guayama, Ponce, Cabo Rojo, Mayagüez, Aguadilla, and Arecibo.

Liga Mayor de Fútbol Nacional
Created by teams that broke away from the TNS, the "Liga Mayor de Fútbol Nacional" (LMFN) (Mayor League National Football) lasted for nine seasons and ran parallel to the TNS.

Champions by season

Championships by team

Campeonato Nacional de Fútbol de Puerto Rico
In 2005, a united national championship was organized by the Puerto Rico Football Federation, the "Campeonato Nacional de Fútbol" (National Football Championship), but it was composed mainly from teams from the LMF.

Puerto Rico Soccer League
In 2008, the first professional league was created, the Puerto Rico Soccer League (PRSL), which was composed of eight teams playing the regular season, and the top four seeded moving on to the playoffs. A ninth team joined in 2009, three teams joined in 2010, and one team joined for the 2011 season, after which the league folded. The new professional league, the Liga Profesional de Fútbol de Puerto Rico, is scheduled to start in 2013.

1The 2008 championship match had only one leg.
2The 2010 season was cancelled. This match was the final of the  Supercopa DirecTV 2010, which served as the qualifier for the 2011 CFU Club Championship.
3The 2011 championship match had only one leg. After 120 minutes, the game was decided in favor of FC Leones de Ponce, who were able to successful convert its first three penalty attempts and, also, were able to stop all three attempts from Sevilla FC Juncos.

Liga Nacional de Fútbol de Puerto Rico
In 2008, along with the first division, a PRSL 2nd division tournament was organized, anticipating a promotion/relegation system, which was scheduled to start in 2011, but that was postponed till 2013. In 2009, the Puerto Rico Football Federation renamed the 2nd division league "Liga Nacional de Fútbol" (National Football League) and made it a separate amateur league. The 2008 season had eighteen teams divided in three groups; the 2009 season had sixteen teams divided in two groups; while the 2010 season had twenty-one teams divided in four groups. For the 2011 season, the LNFPR split into a first division with eight teams and a second division with 14 teams, retaking the promotion/relegation ideas, which is to start in 2013.

1The 2016 season was cancelled. This match was the final of the  2016 Copa Luis Villarejo, which served as the qualifier for the 2017 CFU Club Championship.

References

See also
 Puerto Rican Football Federation
 Puerto Rico Soccer League
 Liga Nacional de Futbol de Puerto Rico
 Campeonato Nacional de Fútbol de Puerto Rico(defunct)
 Liga Mayor de Fútbol Nacional(defunct)
 Association Football in Puerto Rico

Liga Nacional de Fútbol de Puerto Rico
Champions
Puerto